Börje Kenny Olsson (March 6, 1977 in Stockholm, Sweden – June 8, 2007), was a Swedish speedway racer. He rode in the UK for the Trelawny Tigers in 2001 and for the Glasgow Tigers in 2002 in the Premier League.

He competed regularly in the Xtreme International Ice Racing series (ice speedway) in the United States, winning the series in 2004 and 2005.

On June 8, 2007, he died in a hospital after a crash the day before while racing for Vargarna in the Swedish Elite League, had left him with serious head injuries.

References 

1977 births
2007 deaths
Swedish speedway riders
Motorcycle racers who died while racing
Glasgow Tigers riders
Trelawny Tigers riders
Sport deaths in Sweden
Sportspeople from Stockholm